The 1882 British Columbia general election was held in 1882.

Political context

Issues and debates

Non-party system

There were to be no political parties in the new province.  The designations "Government" and "Opposition" and "Independent" (and variations on these) functioned in place of parties, but they were very loose and do not represent formal coalitions, more alignments of support during the campaign.  "Government" meant in support of the current Premier; "Opposition" meant campaigning against him, and often enough the Opposition would win and immediately become the Government.  The Elections British Columbia notes for this election describe the designations as "Government (GOV.) candidates supported the administration of G.A.B. Walkem. Those opposed ran as Reform (REF.), Opposition (OPP.), Independent Reform (IND.REF.), or Independent Opposition (IND.OPP.) candidates. Those who ran as straight Independents (IND.) were sometimes described as Government supporters (IND./GOV.).

The Beaven and Smithe governments

The election was precipitated by the resignation of Premier George Anthony Boomer Walkem.  The Premiership was taken over by Robert Beaven, who managed to retain the reins of government though not with as much support as had been enjoyed by Walkem. His government lasted only about seven months, after which William Smithe became Premier due to shifting loyalties in the House, seeking and winning approval in the next election in May 1886.

Byelections not shown

Any changes due to byelections are shown below the main table showing the theoretical composition of the House after the election.  A final table showing the composition of the House at the dissolution of the Legislature at the end of this Parliament can be found below the byelections.  The main table represents the immediate results of the election only, not changes in governing coalitions or eventual changes due to byelections.

List of ridings

The original ridings were increased by one (Cassiar) and Cowichan was reduced to a one-member seat, although the total of 25 members remained.  There were no political parties were not acceptable in the House by convention, though some members were openly partisan at the federal level (usually Conservative, although both Liberal and Labour allegiance were on display by some candidates).

These ridings were:

Cariboo (three members)   
Cassiar
Comox
Cowichan
Esquimalt (two members)
Kootenay
Lillooet (two members)
Nanaimo (two members)
New Westminster (two members)
New Westminster City
Victoria (two members)
Victoria City (four members)
Yale (three members)

Polling conditions

Natives (First Nations) and Chinese were disallowed from voting, although naturalized Kanakas (Hawaiian colonists) and American and West Indian blacks and certain others participated.  The requirement that knowledge of English be spoken for balloting was discussed but not applied.

Results by riding

|-
||    
|align="center"|Robert McLeese
|align="center" |CaribooGovernment
||    
||    
|align="center" rowspan=2 |CaribooIndependentOpposition
|align="center"|George Cowan
||    
|-
||    
|align="center"|William Munro Dingwall
|align="center"  |ComoxGovernment
||    
||    
|align="center"|Charles Wilson
||    
|-
||    
|align="center"|Hans Lars Helgesen
|align="center"  |EsquimaltGovernment
||    
||    
|align="center"  |CassiarOpposition
|align="center"|John Grant
||    
|-
||    
|align="center"|Robert Leslie Thomas Galbraith
|align="center"  |KootenayGovernment
||    
||    
|align="center"  |CowichanOpposition
|align="center"|William Smithe
||    
|-
||    
|align="center"|William James Armstrong
|align="center"  |New Westminster CityGovernment
||    
||    
|align="center"  |EsquimaltOpposition
|align="center"|Charles Edward Pooley
||    
|-
||    
|align="center"|Robert Beaven 1
|align="center" rowspan= |Victoria CityGovernment
||    
||    
|align="center" rowspan=2 |LillooetOpposition
|align="center"|Edward Allen
||    
|-
|
|
|
|
||    
|align="center"|Alexander Edmund Batson Davie
||    
|-
|
|
|
|
||    
|align="center" rowspan=2 |NanaimoOpposition
|align="center"|Robert Dunsmuir
||    
|-
|
|
|
|
||    
|align="center"|William Raybould
||    
|-
|
|
|
|
||    
|align="center" rowspan=2 |New WestminsterOpposition
|align="center"|James Orr
||    
|-
|
|
|
|
||    
|align="center"|John Robson
||    
|-
|
|
|
|
||    
|align="center" |New Westminster CityOpposition
|align="center"|William James Armstrong
||    
|-
|
|
|
|
||    
|align="center" rowspan=2 |VictoriaOpposition
|align="center"|Robert Franklin John
||    
|-
|
|
|
|
||    
|align="center"|George Archibald McTavish
||    
|-
|
|
|
|
||    
|align="center" rowspan=3 |Victoria CityOpposition
|align="center"|Theodore Davie
||    
|-
|
|
|
|
||    
|align="center"|Simeon Duck
||    
|-
|
|
|
|
||    
|align="center"|Montague William Tyrwhitt-Drake 
||    
|-
|
|
|
|
||    
|align="center" rowspan=3 |YaleOpposition
|align="center"|Preston Bennett
||    
|-
|
|
|
|
||    
|align="center"|John Andrew Mara
||    
|-
|
|align-left"|1 Premier-Elect and Incumbent Premier
|
|
||    
|align="center"|Charles Augustus Semlin
||    
|-
| align="center" colspan="10"|Source: Elections BC 1882 Results
|-
|}

Byelections

As customary, byelections were held to confirm the appointment of various members to the Executive Council (cabinet).  
William James Armstrong, New Westminster City, April 21, 1884
Simeon Duck, Victoria City, April 15, 1885
Alexander Edmund Batson Davie, Lillooet, March 31, 1883
William Smithe, Cowichan, March 31, 1883
John Robson, New Westminster, March 31, 1883

Smithe's byelection acclamation confirmed him as Premier; Executive Council appointments were decided and made by the Lieutenant-Governor in this period, not by the Premier directly, but by the L-G in Consultation with the Premier (as still is the case, though only as a formal technicality, not in practice).  The Premier's position itself was technically an appointment, as there were no political parties nor leaders, other than unofficial ones for each faction in the House to whom the Lieutenant-Governor would turn if their known caucus was sufficient to form a government.

Other byelections were held on the occasion of death, ill health, retirement and/or resignation for other reasons.  These were won by:

James Cunningham, New Westminster City, April 21, 1884, byelection held upon J. Armstrong's appointment as Sherriff April 5, 1884
George Bohun Martin, Yale, October 13, 1882, byelection held because of death of P. Bennett August 9, 1882

Composition of House at dissolution
Note: Government/Opposition status applies to candidate at time of election in 1882, not at time of dissolution in 1886.

|-
||    
|align="center"|Robert McLeese
|align="center" |CaribooGovernment
||    
||    
|align="center" rowspan=2 |CaribooIndependentOpposition
|align="center"|George Cowan
||    
|-
||    
|align="center"|William Munro Dingwall
|align="center"  |ComoxGovernment
||    
||    
|align="center"|Charles Wilson
||    
|-
||    
|align="center"|Hans Lars Helgesen
|align="center"  |EsquimaltGovernment
||    
||    
|align="center"  |CassiarOpposition
|align="center"|John Grant
||    
|-
||    
|align="center"|Robert Leslie Thomas Galbraith
|align="center"  |KootenayGovernment
||    
||    
|align="center"  |CowichanOpposition
|align="center"|William Smithe1
||    
|-
||    
|align="center"|Ebenezer Brown
|align="center"  |New Westminster CityGovernment
||    
||    
|align="center"  |EsquimaltOpposition
|align="center"|Charles Edward Pooley
||    
|-
||    
|align="center"|Preston Bennett
|align="center" rowspan=3 |YaleGovernment
||    
||    
|align="center" rowspan=2 |LillooetOpposition
|align="center"|Edward Allen
||    
|-
||    
|align="center"|John Andrew Mara
||    
||    
|align="center"|Alexander Edmund Batson Davie
||    
|-
||    
|align="center"|Forbes George Vernon
||    
||    
|align="center" rowspan=2 |New WestminsterOpposition
|align="center"|James Orr
||    
|-
||    
|align="center"|Robert Beaven 
|align="center" rowspan= |Victoria CityGovernment
||    
||    
|align="center"|John Robson
||    
|-
|
|
|
|
||    
|align="center" |New Westminster CityOpposition
|align="center"|James Cunningham
||    
|-
|
|
|
|
||    
|align="center" rowspan=2 |VictoriaOpposition
|align="center"|Robert Franklin John
||    
|-
|
|
|
|
||    
|align="center"|George Archibald McTavish
||    
|-
|
|
|
|
||    
|align="center" rowspan=3 |Victoria CityOpposition
|align="center"|Theodore Davie
||    
|-
|
|
|
|
||    
|align="center"|Simeon Duck
||    
|-
|
|
|
|
||    
|align="center"|Montague William Tyrwhitt-Drake 
||    
|-
|
|
|
|
||    
|align="center" rowspan=3 |YaleOpposition
|align="center"|George Bohun Martin
||    
|-
|
|
|
|
||    
|align="center"|John Andrew Mara
||    
|-
|
|
|
|
||    
|align="center"|Charles Augustus Semlin
||    
|-
|
|align-left"|1Premier at Dissolution
|-
|
|align-left" colspan=7|Note:  Government/Opposition/Independent Designations in this table are not indicative of house alignment at dissolution.  This is because those who had been Opposition at the time of the election in 1882 may (or may not) have been part of the outgoing government bench at the time of dissolution.
|-
| align="center" colspan="10"|Source: Elections BC
|-
|}

Further reading & references
In the Sea of Sterile Mountains: The Chinese in British Columbia, Joseph Morton, J.J. Douglas, Vancouver (1974).  Despite its title, a fairly thorough account of the politicians and electoral politics in early BC.

1882
1882 elections in Canada
1882 in British Columbia